Ramanagara Assembly constituency of Karnataka Vidhan Sabha is one of the constituencies located in the Ramanagara district.

It is a part of the Bangalore Rural Lok Sabha constituency, along with eight other assembly constituencies.

Members of Legislative Assembly

References

Assembly constituencies of Karnataka
Bangalore Rural district